Francisco Adriano Caro Rodríguez (born 1870) was the eighth mayor of the commune of Pichilemu, Chile, an office which he held between December 1925 and May 1927.

Biography
Caro Rodríguez was born in San Antonio de Petrel, Pichilemu, Chile. His parents were José María Caro Martínez, first mayor of Pichilemu, and Rita Rodríguez Acevedo; the couple had nine children, including Francisco Adriano and José María, who became the first Chilean Cardinal of the Catholic Church.

Political career
Caro Rodríguez was elected regidor of Pichilemu in 1906 for a three-year term, and was re-elected in 1912, 1918, 1921, and 1924. Following Luis Barahona Fornés' resignation as mayor of Pichilemu in 1925, the Pichilemu City Council elected Francisco Caro to complete his term, which lasted until May 1927.

Eleven days after he took office as mayor of Pichilemu, Caro Rodríguez represented the commune when Pichilemu railway station was inaugurated and the first train arrived, described as a "historically important event" by  Washington Saldías of the Pichilemu News.

References

1870 births
20th-century deaths
Mayors of Pichilemu
Francisco Adriano
Chilean people of Basque descent